Phyllonorycter kusdasi is a moth of the family Gracillariidae. It is found in the Mediterranean region from Spain to Turkey.

There are several generations per year.

The larvae feed on Quercus pubescens. They mine the leaves of their host plant. They create a lower-surface tentiform mine.

References

kusdasi
Moths of Europe
Moths of Asia
Moths described in 1970